Poussy (literally: Pussy) is a Belgian comic strip created in 1949 by Peyo. It is a gag-a-day comic about a cute black cat whose curiosity often gets him into trouble.

Concept
Peyo created Poussy on January 22, 1949, for the Belgian newspaper Le Soir. It was his second series after Johan and Peewit, created three years earlier. It was also published in the comics magazine Spirou and released in album format by the Dupuis editions.

The main character in the series is Poussy, a black-and-white cat who exhibits normal cat-like behavior, such as trying to catch mice, find food, and run away from danger. His owner is a nameless little blond boy. All the gags are mostly without dialogue.

Originally the gags were published in Le Soir in black-and-white. From 1965 on, Spirou published the series in color. In 1969, Peyo's assistant, Lucien De Gieter, took over the series until 1973. In 1976 and 1977 the colorized gags were finally published in album format; three albums have been published.

Albums
 Ça, c'est Poussy (1976) ("That's Pussy")
 Faut pas Poussy (1976) ("Don't do that, Pussy!")
 Poussy Poussa (1977) ("Poussy Carries On")

In other languages
Poussy has been translated into the following languages:

 Dutch: "Poesie"
 German: "Pussy"
 Spanish: "Pusy", "Poussy"
 Swedish: "Katten Karlsson"

References

Belgian comic strips
1949 comics debuts
1973 comics endings
Comics characters introduced in 1949
Fictional cats
Comics about cats
Gag-a-day comics
Pantomime comics
Dupuis titles
Belgian comics characters
Comics by Peyo
Male characters in comics
Peyo characters